School District 27 Cariboo-Chilcotin is a school district in central British Columbia. It covers a large geographic area in the Chilcotin and Cariboo districts, from 100 Mile House in the south to Williams Lake in the north.

The school district had 30 schools as of May 2012. Of these, three are high schools, eight are junior secondary or combined elementary/junior secondary schools, 16 elementary schools and three provide alternative provision. The district also operates a Rural Secondary Program to allow learners to study from home in remote rural areas using virtual classroom. A number of StrongStart BC programs operate in the district and specialist provision is also provided for First Nation learners.

The district educates around 5,800 students and has in the region of 1,000 employees.

Schools
The district has a number of Elementary/Junior schools located in more remote rural areas. These allow learners to continue to study close to their homes. They cater for students in grades 8 and 9, with the opportunity to include grade 10 learners if demand exists.

School enrollment varies between very low numbers - as low as 15 students enrolled at some of the more remote elementary schools in September 2011 - to over 800 students at Columneetza Secondary School.

See also
List of school districts in British Columbia

References

Cariboo
27